Reputation is the thirteenth studio album by British singer Dusty Springfield, and twelfth released. Issued on the Parlophone Records label in the UK and the rest of Europe in June 1990, Reputation was not only Springfield's first studio album in eight years at the time but also her first album to be released in her native UK since 1979's Living Without Your Love. After a string of commercially overlooked albums through the late 1970s and early 1980s Reputation finally managed to resurrect Springfield's career and belatedly resulted in her being re-evaluated and recognised by both music critics and the general public as the UK's foremost 'blue-eyed soul' singer. Mainly produced by Pet Shop Boys and Julian Mendelsohn and recorded in the UK over a period of some eighteen months, Reputation became her highest charting and best-selling album in the UK since 1970's From Dusty with Love, peaking at No. 18 and selling 60,000 copies within two weeks of its release.

Background
In late 1987, Springfield was beginning to look back towards the UK as a source of recording work, due in large part to her collaboration with Pet Shop Boys on their single "What Have I Done to Deserve This?". Pet Shop Boys had contacted Springfield's manager to ask if Springfield would perform guest vocals on the duet. Being a fan of their work, Springfield accepted the offer and the song became a massive hit all over the world, peaking at No. 2 in both the UK and the United States, which proved to be the biggest hit of her career in the US. A brand new greatest hits album The Silver Collection also proved highly popular achieving Platinum status and charting in the UK at #14. 
This renewed Springfield's confidence in recording, as well as interest in her work from the general public, and led to another hit single "Nothing Has Been Proved", also written by Pet Shop Boys with Springfield in mind. The song was written for the movie Scandal, an account of the so-called Profumo affair of 1963, starring Joanne Whalley and John Hurt. "Nothing Has Been Proved" made the Top 20 in Britain, and led to yet another hit single, "In Private", which peaked at No. 14 on the British charts. Despite the fact that "In Private" never was commercially released in the US it managed to become a dance-floor hit in the States as well, peaking at No. 14 on Billboard'''s Hot Dance Club Play chart in early 1990. Both singles were included on Reputation, and Pet Shop Boys collaborated with Springfield on half the album's tracks, which made up side B of the original vinyl edition. Side A included tracks produced by the Pet Shop Boys' longtime collaborator Andy Richards, Swing Out Sister producer Paul Staveley O'Duffy and Dan Hartman. Three of these titles were also mixed by the Pet Shop Boys' co-producer Julian Mendelsohn. Critics gave Reputation very favourable reviews, saying it was a long overdue return to form for Springfield, and the album spawned two further single releases, the title track "Reputation", written by Brian Spence, and the ballad "Arrested by You", written by Rupert Hine and Jeanette Obstoj.

Dan Hartman contributed to the production of three songs from the album; "Send It to Me," "Time Waits for No One" and "Born This Way". "Time Waits for No One" was written by Hartman and Holly Knight. He also played various instruments and provided backing vocals. In a 1990 interview with Springfield, she revealed "Certainly the record company wanted to keep it as much in this country as possible. They finally relented on Dan Hartman, but basically they wanted it to be as British as possible." The three songs were produced at Hartman's own Multi Level Studios, located within his riverside home in Connecticut. Both Springfield and her close friend Helene Sellery stayed at his home during the sessions, which were reported to be slower than anticipated as Hartman was as fussy as Springfield about her vocals, and stopped and started her over and over again.

Release
The Reputation album was, in late 1990, followed by the video collection Reputation – The Videos, released on VHS in the UK and Europe by EMI's subsidiary Picture Music International, including the promo videos for "Nothing Has Been Proved", "In Private", "Reputation", "Arrested by You", interviews with Springfield, as well as a fifth animated promo video for the album track "I Want to Stay Here".

The Reputation album was first released in the US in 1997, then under the title Reputation and Rarities and expanded with additional tracks. This version of the album is also sold digitally from Parlophone Records - it is the only variant of the album currently available in digital distribution.

An expanded version of the album, including multiple mixes and tracks recorded but not included on the original album, was released in August 2016 on Strike Force Entertainment, a division of Cherry Red Records. The 3 disc set includes videos.

Track listing

Personnel
 Simon Bell – backing vocals track: A1, A4,
 Andy Caine – backing vocals track: A1
 Brian Spence  – backing vocals track: A1
 Lance Ellington – backing vocals track: A1
 Andy Richards – keyboards track: A1
 Dan Hartman – all instruments except sax solo track A2, all instruments, programming & backing vocals track A4, additional overdubs & vocals track A5
 Crispin Cioe – saxophone solo track A2
 Claudia Fontaine – backing vocals track A3
 Paul Staveley O'Duffy – drum programming track A3
 Phil Palmer – guitar track A3
 Jean de Aguir – keyboards track A3
 Will Mowat – keyboards track A3
 Luís Jardim – percussion track A3
 Snake Davis – tenor saxophone, alto saxophone track A3
 Sylvia Mason-James – backing vocals track A4
 Geoffrey Williams – programming, vocal harmonies track A5
 Fonzi Thornton – backing vocals track A5
 Tawatha Agee – backing vocals track A5
 Vaneese Thomas – backing vocals track A5
 Jingles – bass guitar track A5
 Michael Graves – organ track A5
 Simon Stirling – programming track A5
 Carol Kenyon – backing vocals track B1
 Katie Kissoon – backing vocals track B1
 Gary Maughan – Fairlight programming & keyboards track B1, Fairlight programming track B3
 Jay Henry – vocals track B2
 Neil Tennant – vocals track B3
 Angelo Badalamenti – orchestral conductor track B3
 Courtney Pine – saxophone track B3
 Tessa Niles – backing vocals track B4

Production
 Andy Richards – record producer track A1
 Peter Jones – sound engineer, mix track A1
 Paul Wright – assistant engineer track A1, sound engineer track B3
 Michael Ade – mix assistant track A1
 Richard Arnold – mix assistant track A1, A2
 Steve Fitzmaurice  – mix assistant track A1
 Dan Hartman – producer track A2, producer, arranger & mix track A4, producer track A5
 Rico Conning – sound engineer track A2, track A4
 Jeremy Wheatley – assistant engineer track A2
 Tom Lord-Alge – mix track A2
 Paul Staveley O'Duffy – producer & engineer track A3
Holly Knight – arranger track A4
 Geoffrey Williams – arranger track A5
 Simon Stirling – arranger track A5
 Tim Hunt – sound engineer track A5
 Dave Ogrin – mix track A5
 Pet Shop Boys – producers tracks B1-B5
 Julian Mendelsohn – producer tracks B1-B5, sound engineer track B1, mix tracks A2, A3, A4
 Danton Supple – assistant engineer tracks B1, B2
 Ren Swan – sound engineer track B2
 Angelo Badalamenti – orchestral arrangement track B3
 Dave Eden – assistant engineer track B3
 David Jacobs – assistant engineer track B5
 Track B3 recorded at Sarm West Studios, London, November 1988
 Track B1 recorded at Sarm West, May 1989
 Track B2, B4 & B5 recorded at Sarm West, between August and November 1989
 Track A3 recorded at Mayfair Recording Studios (London), mixed by Julian Mendelsohn at Sarm West, between August and November 1989
 Track A1 recorded at Townhouse Recording Studios and Sarm West (UK), late 1989/early 1990
 Track A2 recorded at Townhouse Recording Studios and Sarm West (UK), additional recording at Multi-Level (US), mixed by Tom Lord-Alge at The Hit Factory (NY), late 1989/early 1990
 Track A4 recorded at Multi-Level (US), Townhouse Recording Studios (UK), mixed by Julian Mendelsohn at Sarm West (UK), late 1989/early 1990
 Track A5 recorded at Marcus Studios & Townhouse Recording Studios (UK), additional overdubs and vocals at Multi-Level (US), mixed by Dave (O) Origin at The Hit Factory, February 1990.

Chart performance

Singles

 Official promo singles for "Born this Way" and "Daydreaming" were released to radio and clubs.

Certifications

References

Bibliography
 Howes, Paul (2001). The Complete Dusty Springfield. London: Reynolds & Hearn Ltd. 
 O'Brien, Lucy (1988, 2000): Dusty''. London: Pan Books Ltd.

External links
Discogs info
Discogs info 2

1990 albums
Dusty Springfield albums
Albums produced by Dan Hartman
Parlophone albums
Albums produced by Julian Mendelsohn